= Debbie Weinstein =

American technology executive

- Born: 1972 or 1973 (age 51–52); United States
- Education: Brown University; Harvard Business School
- Employers: Goldman Sachs; Unilever; Google

Debbie Weinstein (born 1972 or 1973) is an American technology executive. In December 2024, she was named president of Google across Europe, the Middle East, and Africa. Following her announcement as the new president, Fortune Europe dubbed her "the most powerful woman in European tech."

== Education ==
Weinstein attended Brown University, earning a B.A. in 1995.

In 1999, she graduated with an MBA from Harvard Business School.

== Career ==
Weinstein began her career as a financial analyst for mergers & acquisitions at Goldman Sachs. Prior to joining Google, she worked at Unilever.

She was managing director of Google in the UK and Ireland, and in January 2025, she became president of Google across Europe, the Middle East, and Africa.
